is a passenger railway station  located in Kita-ku Kobe, Hyōgo Prefecture, Japan. It is operated by the private transportation company, Kobe Electric Railway (Shintetsu).

Lines

Station layout
The station consists of two  side platforms, connected by an elevated station building. Since both the station building and the platform are located in a canal, the ticket gates and concourse are on the first basement floor, and the platform is on the second basement floor.

Platforms

Adjacent stations

History
The station was opened on April 6, 1970.

Passenger statistics
In fiscal 2019, the station was used by an average of 10,185 passengers daily

Surrounding area
Kobe Koryo Gakuen High School
Hyogo Prefectural Kobe Kohoku High School
Hyogo Prefectural Kobe Special Needs School
Kobe Municipal Sakuranomiya Elementary School

See also
List of railway stations in Japan

References

External links 

 Official home page 

Railway stations in Kobe
Railway stations in Japan opened in 1970